Phytoecia bucharica is a species of beetle in the family Cerambycidae. It was described by Breuning in 1943. It is known from Tajikistan.

References

Phytoecia
Beetles described in 1943